Highfields School may refer to:

Highfields School, Matlock, a secondary school in Matlock. 

Highfields School, Wolverhampton, a secondary school in Wolverhampton, West Midlands, England

Highfields Private School, Cornwall, a former independent school in Redruth, Cornwall.

See also
The Highfield School
Highfields (disambiguation)